Zuidwolde is a village in the Dutch province of Drenthe. It is located in the municipality of De Wolden, about 7 km southwest of Hoogeveen. The village was integrated with Ruinen since 2008

Zuidwolde was a separate municipality until 1998, when it became part of De Wolden.

Zuidwolde also is the site of the De Vlijt a windmill from the 1800s.

Notable people 
 Bart de Groot (born 1990), footballer
 Henk Hulzebos (born 1950), equestrian
 Wouter Marinus (born 1995), footballer
 Jan Vayne (born 1966), pianist

Gallery

References

Municipalities of the Netherlands disestablished in 1998
Populated places in Drenthe
Former municipalities of Drenthe
De Wolden